Admiral Herbert Gladstone Hopwood (November 23, 1898 – September 15, 1966) was a four-star admiral in the United States Navy who served as commander in chief of the United States Pacific Fleet from 1958 to 1960.

Early career
Born in Shamokin, Pennsylvania to Kendrick Hopwood and Anna Williams, he graduated from the United States Naval Academy in 1919.

His first assignments were to the battleships  and  during the last months of World War I. Between the wars, he served aboard the transport  in the Asiatic Station, the battleship , the destroyer , the fleet replenishment oiler , and the heavy cruiser .

He commanded the destroyer  from 1928 to 1929, commanded the destroyer  from 1938 to 1939, and served as executive officer of the 
destroyer tender  from 1939 to 1940. Staff assignments included tours as an instructor in ordnance and gunnery at the Naval Academy; as aide to the commandant of the Fourth Naval District; and afloat as flag lieutenant on the staffs of Commander Destroyers, Battle Force and Commander Scouting Force.

From the beginning of World War II to June 1944, he served in the Bureau of Naval Personnel, with additional duty on the Joint Chiefs of Staff Planning Staff. As Director of Planning and Control in the Bureau of Naval Personnel, he implemented the program that dramatically expanded the Navy to meet wartime personnel requirements, and was promoted to captain. He went to sea as commanding officer of the light cruiser  from August 14, 1944 to early 1945, participating in the capture of Peleliu, Anguar, and Ngesebus; and the recapture of Corregidor and Mariveles.

Flag officer
After the war, he returned to Washington D.C. for a series of staff assignments and promotion to rear admiral. He served successively as assistant chief of naval personnel; as assistant chief of naval operations; as budget director of the Navy from 1946 to 1950, in which role he played a minor part in the Revolt of the Admirals when his testimony before a Congressional committee suggested that Secretary of Defense Louis Johnson had usurped the powers of Congress by unilaterally refusing to spend appropriated funds; and as deputy comptroller of the Navy Department from 1950 to 1952.

He went to sea in command of Cruiser Division Three and Cruiser Destroyer Force, Pacific Fleet from 1952 to 1953, and was assigned as chief of staff and aide to the Commander in Chief of the Pacific Fleet from 1953 to 1955. He was promoted to vice admiral in 1955 and appointed commander of the First Fleet, then served as Deputy Chief of Naval Operations (Logistics) from 1957 to 1958.

On February 1, 1958, he was promoted to admiral and appointed commander in chief of the Pacific Fleet (CINCPACFLT), a command that included about 400 ships, half a million men, and 3,000 aircraft. On August 23, the Second Taiwan Strait Crisis erupted when People's Liberation Army forces began shelling Republic of China positions on the disputed islands of Quemoy and Matsu. Hopwood deployed the Seventh Fleet into the Taiwan Strait to help the Nationalist government protect Quemoy's supply lines, as directed by Admiral Harry D. Felt, Commander in Chief, Pacific (CINCPAC).

In January 1960, Hopwood participated in the first public demonstration of a new Navy communications system that used the moon as a radio relay to exchange teletype messages between Hopwood in Hawaii and Chief of Naval Operations Arleigh Burke in Washington, D.C. In June, he hosted President Dwight D. Eisenhower at Kaneohe Marine Corps Air Station when the President took a brief holiday in Hawaii following a trip to the Far East. He was relieved by Admiral John H. Sides on August 30, 1960 and retired from the Navy on September 1.

Personal life
After retiring from the Navy, he worked as vice president in charge of operations for the Grace Steamship Company until 1964.

He married the former Jean Fulton and they had three children: son Herbert Gladstone Jr., an officer in the Navy Medical Corps and later a prominent obstetrician in Arlington, Virginia; son Kendrick Alexander; and daughter Jean.  They lived in retirement in Short Hills, New Jersey.

He was awarded with Navy Distinguished Service Medal during Cold War and twice with the Legion of Merit for his World War II service, once as Director of Planning and Control in the Bureau of Naval Personnel and once as commanding officer of the light cruiser Cleveland.

He is the namesake of Hopwood Junior High School in Saipan, originally the first institution of higher learning in the Commonwealth of the Northern Mariana Islands, which was renamed in his honor in the late 1950s when he was Commanding Officer for the Northern Marianas as CINCPACFLT.

He died at St. Barnabas Hospital in Livingston, New Jersey at the age of 67, and is buried with his wife in Arlington National Cemetery.

Decorations

References

People from Millburn, New Jersey
United States Navy admirals
United States Naval Academy alumni
1898 births
1966 deaths
Burials at Arlington National Cemetery
United States Navy personnel of World War II
Recipients of the Navy Distinguished Service Medal
Recipients of the Legion of Merit
People from Shamokin, Pennsylvania
Military personnel from Pennsylvania
Military personnel from New Jersey